James H. Hilton Coliseum, commonly Hilton Coliseum, is a 14,267-seat multi-purpose arena located in Ames, Iowa. The arena opened in 1971. It is home to the Iowa State University Cyclones men's and women's basketball teams, wrestling, gymnastics and volleyball teams.

Overview

The building was constructed in 1971 as part of the Iowa State Center, an athletic and cultural events area located southeast of the main campus.  The Coliseum was named after Dr. James H. Hilton, ISU's president from 1953 to 1965, who pushed for the construction of the facility.  The Iowa State Center also includes Jack Trice Stadium, C.Y. Stephens Auditorium, Fisher Theater and Scheman Continuing Education Building.  Hilton Coliseum and Jack Trice Stadium replaced the Iowa State Armory and Clyde Williams Stadium, at the corner of Union Dr. & Sheldon Ave.

The first band to ever perform at the Hilton Coliseum was Meloncolony, a band composed of Midwest natives: Chuck Vail (singer), Wayne Groff (organ), Matt Peterson (bass), Clint Dudley (guitar), and Bob Curtis (drums). The band performed at an event organized by the YMCA to both entertain and encourage 2,300 locals to register to vote. Of the 2,300, 200 people registered that night. Phish played the arena in both 1996 and 1999.

The arena hosted the 1972 NCAA basketball tournament Midwest Regionals, as well as the 1982, 1988 and 1993 NCAA wrestling championships.  The arena is also the site of the annual Iowa All State Music Festival.  It has also hosted commencements, concerts, conventions and other assemblies.  A record basketball crowd of 15,000 saw the Cyclones post a 97-94 win over Iowa in 1971.  Until Wells Fargo Arena in Des Moines was built, Hilton Coliseum was Central Iowa's premier entertainment venue.

Hilton Magic 

"Hilton Magic", the power of the Coliseum faithful to produce unexpected victories, was first recognized by Des Moines Register sportswriter Buck Turnbull.  On a Feb. 14, 1989, showdown with No. 3 Missouri, the Cyclones conjured up the spirit of the Hilton crowd to produce a stunning 82–75 victory.  The following day’s headline read “Hilton Magic Spells ‘Upset’ One More Time.”

In the article, Turnbull called for more “Hilton Magic” in the Cyclones’ upcoming bout with Oklahoma State, which had pummeled ISU, 102–74, just three weeks earlier.  On cue, “Hilton Magic” displayed its powers, as the Cyclones defeated the Cowboys, 90–81, marking a 37-point reversal from the season’s prior meeting.

Hilton Coliseum was specifically built to hold in sound with a solid concrete structure, steel doors, and a crowd that sits just a few feet from the court. With a fan base that frequently ranks among the nation's largest crowds, players from opposing teams, as well as Iowa State, have said that the floor has shaken due to the loudness of the crowd.

After more than two decades, the term “Hilton Magic” still applies today.  This reality was never more apparent than ISU’s school-record 39-game homecourt winning streak that ended during the 2001-02 season. The streak, which spanned four different basketball seasons, was the second-longest in the nation at the time. In 2003-04, Iowa State went 17–1 in Hilton, recording the second-best single-season home win total in school history. In 2011-12, Iowa State went 16–2 with second year head coach and Iowa State alum, "The Mayor" Fred Hoiberg.

On March 2, 2015, the Cyclones made one of its most miraculous comebacks in school history.  Trailing by 21 points early in the second half, No. 17 Iowa State rallied to beat No. 15 Oklahoma, 77–70, in Hilton Coliseum.  The 21-point come-from-behind victory tied the largest comeback in school history.

In the last 7 seasons (2012–2018) Iowa State is 94–16 in Hilton Coliseum, but went 9–7 in Hilton Coliseum in 2018.

Athletic Events

Basketball

James H. Hilton Coliseum is recognized as one of the finest facilities for collegiate basketball in the nation. CBS SportsLine.com’s Dan Wetzel rated Hilton No. 10 on his list of the nation’s top college basketball arenas. Until the completion of the Sukup Practice Facility in the fall of 2009, both Cyclone squads held practices and games in the 14,384-seat arena. Both women's and men's teams continue to play home games at Hilton.

Hilton offers newly refurbished dressing rooms for both the ISU women's and men's teams, and additional rooms for visiting teams and officials. Hilton also houses a weight room, training room, media room, and the newly refurbished offices of the women's volleyball team.  Men and women's basketball offices were relocated to the Sukup Practice Facility on its completion.

The men’s team has compiled a 112–24 (.824 winning percentage) home record during the last eight years. Iowa State has posted 10 or more home victories in the last 14 seasons.

Hilton Magic has been ever-present recently, helping the Cyclones tally a school-record 39 consecutive wins in the facility. The Cyclones went undefeated at home during the 1999-2000 and 2000-01 seasons and increased their winning streak to 30 games at the beginning of the 2001-02 campaign.

Iowa State and Hilton broke NIT attendance marks in 2004. The Cyclones drew 12,196 and 14,020 fans in their two NIT games they hosted, averaging 13,144 fans per contest. The Cyclones were 30th nationally in attendance in 2005 and were 26th in 2006.

The Iowa State women ranked among the top 11 nationally in women’s basketball attendance average for the eighth consecutive year last season, playing in front of 7,667 fans per game. Cyclone fans are getting their money’s worth, as ISU recorded its third undefeated home slate (15–0) in Hilton Coliseum in 2004-05. In 2009, the Cyclones had the 3rd highest attendance average in the nation.

The Cyclones recorded the first women’s basketball sellout crowd when 14,092 attended the WNIT double-header in Hilton Coliseum on March 25, 2004. ISU defeated Saint Joseph's, 66–58, to advance to the WNIT Final Four. Iowa State and its enthusiastic crowds earned the Cyclones a homecourt advantage for all four WNIT postseason games.

Both the men’s and women’s teams closed out the 2000-01 season with nationally ranked home win streaks. Together, the two programs posted a 65–1 record in Hilton Coliseum in the 1999-2000 and 2000-01 seasons combined. In 2001-02 the combined men’s and women’s basketball attendance ranked 6th nationally (22,406). During the 2014-15 season, the Cyclone women scored major upsets at home against No. 3 Texas, 59–57, on Jan. 10, and No. 3 Baylor, 76–71, on Senior Day, Feb. 28, 2015.

On January 17, 2015, Hilton Coliseum hosted ESPN's College Gameday in front of roughly 7,000 fans.  That evening, a sold-out Hilton saw the No. 11 Cyclones defeat No. 9 Kansas, 86–81.

Through the 2017-18 season, the Iowa State men's basketball team boasts a 544–179 record at Hilton Coliseum.

Wrestling

Some of the most cherished moments in Hilton Coliseum history have come by way of the tradition-rich ISU wrestling program. Hilton was home to Cael Sanderson’s unprecedented, undefeated 4-year career of 159–0 and his quartet of national championships.

Fans in Hilton on January 9, 1981, also had the privilege of seeing Dave Osenbaugh’s pin of national heavyweight champion Lou Banach of Iowa.

The Iowa State wrestling program has hosted five NCAA Championship events in 1974, 1979, 1982, 1988 and 1993 and Hilton has been home to eight conference meets in 1976, 1979, 1983, 1986, 1994, 1999, 2004, and most recently in 2006.

Gymnastics

James H. Hilton Coliseum is recognized as one of the finest facilities in the nation and provides a top-notch home for the Iowa State gymnastics team, playing host to the 2000 Big 12 Championship and the 2006 NCAA Regional Meet.

Volleyball

The Iowa State volleyball team also calls Hilton Coliseum home. The Cyclones hosted the NCAA First Round in 1995 at Hilton Coliseum, defeating No. 22 Idaho in straight sets on Nov. 29, in the Cyclones' first-ever NCAA Tournament appearance.  Iowa State also hosted NCAA First and Second Round games in 2009, 2011, and 2012.

Concerts
Aerosmith 
Bad Company
Billy Joel
Bruce Springsteen
Bush
Cheap Trick
Commodores
Eagles
Elton John
Huey Lewis and The News
Garth Brooks
Genesis 
Guns and Roses
Inxs
James Taylor
Justin Timberlake 
Martina McBride
Metallica
MC Hammer
Olivia Newton John
Queen
Smashing Pumpkins
Sugarland
The Cult
The Who

Construction

Previous Construction
The arena received a new $2.5 million video and sound system in 2006.  These improvements are just the beginning of the up $60 million in planned renovation and construction to the facility, over the next 10 years.

For the start of the 2016-2017 Men's Basketball season new blackout lighting was introduced that allows the stadium to be blacked out and then immediately resume normal lighting conditions. This allows them to provide special lighting sequences like when announcing players before a game starts.

Flooding
Hilton Coliseum was constructed in the flood plain of Ioway Creek.  The Coliseum has been inundated with flood water in both 1993 and 2010, but its mostly concrete design simplifies restoring it to service after floods.

See also
 List of NCAA Division I basketball arenas

References

External links
 Iowa State Center Official Website
 Iowa State Cyclones official athletic site
 Iowa State University's Hilton Coliseum

College basketball venues in the United States
College wrestling venues in the United States
Iowa State Cyclones basketball venues
Iowa State Cyclones wrestling venues
Basketball venues in Iowa
1971 establishments in Iowa
Sports venues completed in 1971
College volleyball venues in the United States
College gymnastics venues in the United States